Nanning Wuxu International Airport  is an airport serving Nanning, the capital of Guangxi Autonomous Region, China. The airport was built in 1962, with improvements made in 1990. It is designed to handle 16 million passengers annually. The number of passengers reached 1 million in 2002, and jumped to 2 million by 2006. In 2016, 11.56 million passengers used the airport.

History during World War II
During World War II, the airport was known as Nanning Airfield and was used by the United States Army Air Forces Fourteenth Air Force as part of the China Defensive Campaign (1942–1945).  It was used primarily by reconnaissance units, which operated unarmed P-38 Lightning photo-recon aircraft that flew over Japanese-held territory and obtained intelligence used by combat units.  Detachments of fighter and bomber squadrons also operated occasionally from the airfield, along with being a supply point for the 2d Combat Cargo Squadron, which air-dropped supplies and munitions to ground forces on the front lines.  At the end of the war, the transports also hauled men, horses and mules to the airfield. The Americans closed their facilities at the end of October 1945.

Airlines and destinations

Passengers

Cargo

Ground transportation
Beside parking facilities and taxis, two airport bus lines connect the airport with the city center: Line No. 1 serving the Chaoyang Road Airline Ticket Office (near Nanning railway station) and Line No. 2 serving Wuxiang Square. The under construction Nanning–Pingxiang high-speed railway will have a dedicated station at the airport, Wuxu Airport railway station.

See also

List of airports in China
List of the busiest airports in China

References

External links

Official website

Airports in Guangxi
Airfields of the United States Army Air Forces in China
Airport Wuxu
Airports established in 1962
1962 establishments in China